Booker T Washington High School (also known as BTW) is a public secondary school located north of Downtown Memphis, on the southside of Memphis, Tennessee, United States. The school was administered by the Memphis City Schools system, until the beginning of the 2013-14 year, it was served by the Shelby County Schools district. It serves grades 9-12. The school gained national attention when U.S. President Barack Obama delivered the school's 2011 commencement address as a reward for winning the 2011 Race to the Top Commencement Challenge.

History
The school was founded as the Clay Street School in 1873 and was among the first public high schools for African Americans in Memphis. Green Polonius Hamilton was its principal. It was renamed Kortrecht High School in 1891.

In 1926 a new building was constructed and the school was renamed in honor of American educator and civil rights leader Booker T. Washington. Further expansions were completed in the years since, including the Blair T. Hunt Gymnasium, dedicated in 1950.

Race to the Top
The school entered and won the 2011 Race to the Top Commencement Challenge, a competition that "invites public high schools across the country to demonstrate how their school best prepares [students] for college and a career." Among the required application materials were student essays and videos that demonstrated the school's innovation in education. The accomplishments of the school included increasing graduation rates from 55% in 2007 to 82% in 2010 through the use of same-gender freshman classrooms and increased teacher effectiveness. BTW also suffered from and overcame high teen pregnancy and violence rates. The school beat out more than 450 other applicant schools, and as a reward for this achievement, President Barack Obama delivered the school's 2011 commencement speech.

Notable alumni

Johnny Ace- Memphis, R&B singer 
 J. Blackfoot - Memphis, Tennessee Soul Singer, member of The Soul Children, best known for his hit song "Taxi" 
 The Bar-Kays - Popular Memphis, Tennessee soul, R&B, and funk band formed in 1966.
 Marion Barry - Former mayor of Washington, D.C.
 Lucie Campbell - Evangelist and songwriter
 W. W. Herenton - First African American mayor of Memphis
George W. Haley, lawyer, politician, public official, and ambasador
 Benjamin Hooks - American civil rights leader and executive director of the National Association for the Advancement of Colored People
 Verdell Mathis - Negro league baseball player
 The Mad Lads - Memphis, Tennessee soul, R&B, Stax recording vocal group formed at Booker T Washington High School in 1965.
 Booker T. Jones - American musician and leader of Booker T & The MGs
 David Porter (musician) - Stax Records songwriter of many '60s and '70s hits, including Soul Man for Sam & Dave
 Maxine Smith - Academic, civil rights activist, and school board official.
 Oscar Reed - Former American professional football player who played running back eight seasons for the Minnesota Vikings from 1968-1974
 Judge Russell B. Sugarmon, Jr. - Civil rights attorney and Member of the Tennessee House of Representatives
 Rufus Thomas - Stax Records writer and performer
 Maurice White - founder of soul & RB hitmakers Earth, Wind and Fire
 Lorenzen Wright - Professional Basketball Player
 Fred Valentine - Major League Baseball outfielder

See also
 List of things named after Booker T. Washington

References

External links 

BTWHS Website

African-American history in Memphis, Tennessee
Public high schools in Tennessee
Schools in Memphis, Tennessee
Historically segregated African-American schools in Tennessee